Ischnolea inexpectata is a species of beetle in the family Cerambycidae. It was described by Galileo and Martins in 1993. It is known from Brazil.

References

Desmiphorini
Beetles described in 1993